Wirrealpa Station is a pastoral lease that operates as a sheep station and cattle station in South Australia.

The lease dates back to the early 1850s, with the station being established in 1856, John Chambers owned the station in the late 1850s and eventually sold it to Philip Levi. Levi had sustained heavy losses through the drought in the 1860s and Wirrealpa was acquired by John Howard Angus in 1871.

The shearers quarters were built in 1860, today they are used as accommodation for tourists visiting the area.

It was stocked with 16,000 sheep at the time that were not included in the deal.
F. H. Fargher and sons acquired a  portion of Wirrelapa in 1953, including the eight bedroom stone homestead situated on the area. They bought the property from the Mundi Mundi Pastoral Company at a cost of £65,688.
The Fargher family still owned the property in 2014 even after suffering through a twenty-year drought from 1990 to 2010.

The land occupying the extent of the Wirrealpa pastoral lease was gazetted by the Government of South Australia as a locality in April 2013 under the name 'Wirrealpa'.

See also
List of ranches and stations

References

Pastoral leases in South Australia
Stations (Australian agriculture)
1856 establishments in Australia
Far North (South Australia)